The Healing is the third album by underground hip hop group Strange Fruit Project, released July 25, 2006 on Om Records. The album was generally well-received, and drew the group comparisons to underground peers like Little Brother. The release was beloved by underground fans for its "Golden Age" style similar to that of the Native Tongues Posse, with Jazzy production and socially conscious lyrical content. Allmusic gave the album a 3 Star rating, and stated:
"The Healing is an album of solidly good hip-hop, nothing that really will blow any underground fans away, but absolutely enough to keep them listening."

The album features guest appearances from Little Brother, Erykah Badu, Toby, Thesis, Deloach, Bavu, Darien Brockington, Yahzarah, Verbal Seed, K-Otix, Tahiti, Skotch and Kay, as well as production from group member Symbolyc One, Illmind, Daddy, Jake One, 9th Wonder and Vitamin D. The Healing features the single "Soul Clap" b/w "Special".

Track listing

Album singles

References

2006 albums
Strange Fruit Project albums
Albums produced by 9th Wonder
Albums produced by Jake One
Albums produced by Illmind
Albums produced by Symbolyc One
Om Records albums